She's in the Army Now is a 1981 American made-for-television military comedy film starring Kathleen Quinlan, Jamie Lee Curtis, Melanie Griffith, Susan Blanchard and Julie Carmen, directed by Hy Averback. It premiered as the ABC Friday Night Movie on May 15, 1981.

The film was a pilot for a television series which never materialized and it also followed the success of Goldie Hawn's movie, Private Benjamin, which itself spawned a television series in the spring of 1981.

Plot
Cass, Rita, Sylvie, Virginia, and Yvette, are five beautiful Women's Army Corps recruits attached to the United States Army's 3rd Platoon of Alpha Company at Fort Jackson. Although they are raw recruits, their drill sergeant, Sgt. Reed sees them as future soldiers. The proposal relates the women's efforts to train to become soldiers while also dealing with their personal problems. During and by the end of their basic training, they discover that a soldier's life is more than a uniform and that strength doesn't always depend on the size of their muscles.

Cast
 Kathleen Quinlan as Pvt. Cass Donner
 Jamie Lee Curtis as Pvt. Rita Jennings
 Melanie Griffith as Pvt. Sylvie Knoll
 Susan Blanchard as Pvt. Virginia Marshall
 Julie Carmen as Pvt. Yvette Rios
 Janet MacLachlan as Sgt. Reed
 Dale Robinette as Sgt. Barnes
 Robert Pierce as Virgin Knoll
 Steven Bauer as Nick Donato (credited as Rocky Bauer)

External links

1981 television films
1981 comedy films
1981 films
ABC network original films
American comedy television films
Television films as pilots
Military humor in film
ABC Motion Pictures films
Films directed by Hy Averback
1981 drama films
1980s English-language films
1980s American films